In statistics, Deming regression, named after W. Edwards Deming, is an errors-in-variables model which tries to find the line of best fit for a two-dimensional dataset. It differs from the simple linear regression in that it accounts for errors in observations on both the x- and the y- axis. It is a special case of total least squares, which allows for any number of predictors and a more complicated error structure.

Deming regression is equivalent to the maximum likelihood estimation of an errors-in-variables model in which the errors for the two variables are assumed to be independent and normally distributed, and the ratio of their variances, denoted δ, is known. In practice, this ratio might be estimated from related data-sources; however the regression procedure takes no account for possible errors in estimating this ratio.

The Deming regression is only slightly more difficult to compute than the simple linear regression. Most statistical software packages used in clinical chemistry offer Deming regression.

The latter book became so popular in clinical chemistry and related fields that the method was even dubbed Deming regression in those fields.

Specification 

Assume that the available data (yi, xi) are measured observations of the "true" values (yi*, xi*), which lie on the regression line:
 
where errors ε and η are independent and the ratio of their variances is assumed to be known:
 

We seek to find the line of "best fit"  
 
such that the weighted sum of squared residuals of the model is minimized:
 

See  for a full derivation.

Solution 
The solution can be expressed in terms of the second-degree sample moments. That is, we first calculate the following quantities (all sums go from i = 1 to n):
 

Finally, the least-squares estimates of model's parameters will be

Orthogonal regression
For the case of equal error variances, i.e., when , Deming regression becomes orthogonal regression: it minimizes the sum of squared perpendicular distances from the data points to the regression line. In this case, denote each observation as a point zj in the complex plane (i.e., the point (xj, yj) is written as zj = xj + iyj where i is the imaginary unit).  Denote as Z the sum of the squared differences of the data points from the centroid (also denoted in complex coordinates), which is the point whose horizontal and vertical locations are the averages of those of the data points. Then:

If Z = 0, then every line through the centroid is a line of best orthogonal fit.

A trigonometric representation of the orthogonal regression line was given by Coolidge in 1913.

Application

In the case of three non-collinear points in the plane, the triangle with these points as its vertices has a unique Steiner inellipse that is tangent to the triangle's sides at their midpoints. The major axis of this ellipse falls on the orthogonal regression line for the three vertices. The quantification of a biological cell's intrinsic cellular noise can be quantified upon applying Deming regression to the observed behavior of a two reporter synthetic biological circuit.

See also
 Line fitting

References
Notes

Bibliography
 
 
 
 
 
 
 
 
 
 

 

Curve fitting
Regression analysis